Studio craft is the practice of craft methodology in an artist's studio. Traditional craft tends to generate craft objects out of necessity or for ceremonial use while studio craft  produces craft objects at the whim of the maker or intended owner. These objects are at most only desirable for use and often lack any utility. Because studio craft doesn't make objects out of necessity, it is similar to works of studio art which are made for aesthetic rather than functional purposes. 

Because of their diminished reliance on making objects for functionality, the studio craft object becomes more viable for the kind of aesthetic critical theory which occurs in fine art theory.

Craft theory 

Though studio craft works do seem to have some of the necessary conditions required for injection into critical art discourse, simplifying craft theory as synonymous with art theory strikes some crafts theorists as problematic. Glenn Adamson argues that the interesting thing about Craft is that it is perceived to be 'inferior' to art. In his book Thinking Through Craft Adamson presents an overview of this question in five chapters:  supplemental, material, skilled, pastoral, and amateur  Contrary to the implied second-class status of these themes, Adamson suggests that these are in fact the things that make craft significant and unique. Another craft theorist, Jenni Sorkin, uses Craft as a distinct portal into topics such as labor, gender, and community.

History 

The arts and crafts movement (1880- 1920) 
The arts and crafts movement had significant influence in the formulation of the studio crafts due in large part to the arts and crafts movement's emphasis on both the hand made object and the importance of the individual maker. This has been especially true in North America  (see American craft) and the British Isles. Early furniture makers in this field include Gustav Stickley, Charles Rohlfs, Frank Lloyd Wright, and brothers Charles Sumner Green and Henry Mather Green (Greene and Greene).

DIY craft
One of the more recent developments in studio craft seems to be the emergence of a solidified do-it-yourself (DIY) movement. Since the mid-century turn towards the conceptualization of the craft object significant academic and institutional structures have emerged to support studio craft. As of 2008 there are hundreds of masters and even doctoral programs dedicated solely to working in crafts media and theory, and as many museums and cultural institutions dedicated to contemporary craft. This trend however has not been without its opponents who claim that studio craft has undercut its origins by overinflating its product, making it entirely inaccessible to anyone who cannot afford the exorbitant prices studio craftspeople demand. These arguments have grown louder and there has been a significant trend towards listening to the voices of "DIYers," that is, makers whose training has not come from a necessarily institutional source and whose audience lies outside the narrow confines of "Studio Craft Institutions."  DIY craft can be found in many places among them the internet hub Etsy and in many craft fairs and venues around the country. 
The work of "DIYers" is often pejoratively referred to as "Crafty Craft" or "Craft with a K."

See also
American craft

Citations

External links 
British Crafts Council
The American Crafts Council
The Fuller Craft Museum
The Journal of Modern Craft
The Museum of Contemporary Craft
The Society of Contemporary Craft

Decorative arts
Handicrafts
Arts and Crafts movement
American art
Crafts